Bandar-log is a term used in Rudyard Kipling's The Jungle Book (1894) to describe the monkeys of the Seeonee jungle.

Description
In Hindi, Bandar means "monkey" and log means "people" – hence the term simply refers to "monkey people". The term has also since come to refer to "any body of irresponsible chatterers."

History
The Bandar-log feature most prominently in the story "Kaa's Hunting", where their scatterbrained anarchy causes them to be treated as pariahs by the rest of the jungle. Their foolish and chattering ways are illustrated by their slogan: We are great. We are free. We are wonderful. We are the most wonderful people in all the jungle! We all say so, and so it must be true. Bandar-log communicate almost entirely through the repetition of other animals' speech.

The Road-Song of the Bandar-log is a companion poem to 'Kaa's Hunting', and demonstrates Kipling's strong adherence to poetic form.

In other media
 The Bandar-log appear in Disney's The Jungle Book. In the animated franchise of this movie, they are portrayed as having moptop hairstyles and prehensile tails, the latter being a feature which is non-existent in Old World monkeys. It is stated repeatedly in the Kipling story that the Bandar-log "have no king;" however, the Disney film version gave them one: King Louie. He is an orangutan, but in reality, orangutans are not found in India. The Bandar-log capture Mowgli and take him to Louie. They participate in the "I Wan'na Be Like You" musical number, during which Baloo and Bagheera attempt to free Mowgli from Louie who tries to get Mowgli to divulge the secrets to the "red flower" (a name given to fire).
 Some of the monkeys are also included in the TV Show Talespin, as employees of Louie's Island-Bar.
 The Bandar-log reappear in The Jungle Book 2, this time without their leader Louie who was mentioned to have left the jungle. They are just seen dancing with Baloo, Mowgli, and other animals during the song "W-I-L-D."
 In Jungle Book Shonen Mowgli, Louis/Alba and his monkey army are clearly based on the Bandar-log although they are not referred to as such. They also have an alliance with Shere Khan, with Louis/Alba being an informant, but also fear him. After they destroyed Mowgli's hut, they were persuaded to cast off their alliance, which they do, and later act as an independent gang.
 The Bandar-Log also appear in the Russian series Adventures of Mowgli. Like in the literature and aforementioned portrayals, they kidnap Mowgli and bring him to their city. They are later defeated by Kaa's hypnotic dancing.
 In the 1994 live-action Disney film, the Bandar-log appear more as mischievous treasure thieves associated with King Louie (an orangutan again). Their vocal effects are provided by using sounds of chimpanzees and siamangs. One day, a monkey is seen stealing a bracelet from a boy raised by wolves named Mowgli, which belonged and was offered to him by Katherine "Kitty" Brydon in their childhood before Mowgli was separated from civilization along with his pet wolf, Grey Brother. The monkey then runs off with Mowgli and Grey Brother in pursuit until they reach an abandoned city inhabited by monkeys called "Monkey City." After Mowgli (with Grey Brother told to wait outside) enters the city and into the treasure trove, the Bandar-log are seen gathering along with their "king," King Louie wearing King Louis XIV's crown. When Mowgli demands that King Louie returns his bracelet and the ape refuses, the ape summons his treasure guardian; Kaa the deadly python. The monkeys watch in shock as a battle ensues between the boy and the snake in the moat; ending with the boy triumphing by wounding the snake with a dagger he found with the treasure pile and winning. After Mowgli wins and stares at the monkeys, the monkeys start to fear him. King Louie admits defeat, returns the bracelet to Mowgli, and applauds him with the monkeys cheering over his victory. Later on, when Captain Boone and Kitty reach the treasure trove, King Louie and the monkeys watch in horror as Mowgli and Boone engage in a fierce sword fight. The battle ends with Mowgli wounding the evil soldier on the right arm with a dagger. The Bandar-log cheer for Mowgli's next victory and King Louie takes care of the rest by summoning Kaa again. As Mowgli and Kitty leave the place and Boone stays to gather some loot since "the treasure only brings death," the monkeys continue screeching, chittering, and cheering. Then, when King Louie and the Bandar-log stop, Boone suspects this means something strange is about to happen. His suspicions are proven correct when Kaa surprises Boone from behind; causing him to fall into the moat. When Boone is underwater, dragged down by the weight of the treasure in his backpack, he notices a few skeletons of people whom Kaa had killed in the past. Boone joins them while screaming in terror when Kaa unexpectedly appears and strikes, thus killing him. The Bandar-log and King Louie are happy and cheer over Boone's death.
 The Bandar-Log appear in the 2010 TV series. They are led by a female langur named Masha, who is their queen.
 In the 2016 film, the Bandar-log are portrayed as various species of Indian primates (namely lion-tailed macaques, northern pig-tailed macaques, langurs, and Hoolock gibbons that resemble northern white-cheeked gibbons) rather than all being the same species of monkey. They again kidnap Mowgli and present him to their leader King Louie, who is a Gigantopithecus in this version, in order to learn the secret of the "red flower." As in the 1994 film, they do not speak. Their vocal effects were created by using sounds of chimpanzees and gibbons in addition to uncredited voice actors. When King Louie gets buried beneath the rubble of his lair, the Bandar-log work to dig him out.
 The Bandar-Log are also seen in Mowgli: Legend of the Jungle. Like in the anime, they are in league with Shere Khan. The Bandar-log kidnap Mowgli following his hunting exercise on Tabaqui's command so Shere Khan could kill him, but are thwarted by Bagheera, Baloo, and Kaa.
 Charles Koechlin wrote a symphonic poem Les Bandar-Log (1939-40), part of a Jungle Book Cycle.

References

External links 
 Road Song of the Bandar-Log

The Jungle Book characters
Fictional monkeys
Literary characters introduced in 1894
Monkeys in India
Male characters in literature